Sir William de Fenton, Lord of Baikie and Beaufort, was a 13th-14th century Scottish noble.

William was one of Robert de Brus, Lord of Annandale's auditors during the arbitration for the Crown of Scotland between 1291 and 1292.

He performed homage to King Edward I of England at Berwick-upon-Tweed on 28 August 1296. He also performed fealty to Edward I on 14 March 1304 at St. Andrews. His coat of arms was "Argent, three crescents gules".

Family and issue
He married Cecilia Bisset, the co-heiress of John Bisset, Lord of Lovat, and is known to have had the following issue:

John de Fenton
Alice de Fenton, married Henry St Clair; had issue.

Citations

References
Barron, E. M., "The Scottish War of Independence", Second Edition. 1934
Proceedings of the Society of Antiquaries of Scotland, Volume 8; 1871.

Year of birth unknown
Year of death unknown
Scottish soldiers
Scottish people of the Wars of Scottish Independence
13th-century Scottish people
14th-century Scottish people
William